The House of Kalajdžieski family, or House of Kalajdžievci is a house in the village of Vevčani, Vevčani Municipality, Macedonia. The house belongs to the Kalajdžieski family and the building is registered as a Cultural Heritage of Macedonia.

The house is located in the old part of Vevčani, in close proximity to the St. Nicholas Church.

History
The Kalajdžieski family ― the owners of the house ― who were widely known traders, had a shop for gas for gas lighting, long pile blankets and food in this place.

At the end of the 19th century, a fire broke out in which the house burned down and members of the Kalajdzieski family died, trying to save part of the furniture. Due to the family's popularity, some Turkish individuals helped them financially to rebuild the house on the same foundation.

During the People's Liberation Struggle, the house was used to hide the partisans and to hold secret meetings.

Architecture 

The house of Kalajdžievci is a tall house with a narrow front, a spacious veranda at the front and a clearly differentiated summer-time apartment on the first floor made of light bundwerk construction and a winter-time apartment on a massive mezzanine.

Gallery

See also
 House of Kostojčinoski family - a cultural heritage site
 House of Duckinoski family - a cultural heritage site
 House of Korunoski family - a cultural heritage site
 House of Ḱitanoski family - a cultural heritage site
 House of Pešinoski family - a cultural heritage site
 House of Pluškoski family - a cultural heritage site
 House of Gogoski family - a cultural heritage site
 House of Daskaloski family - a cultural heritage site
 House of Poposki family - a cultural heritage site
 Kostojčinoski fulling mill and gristmill - a cultural heritage site

References

External links 

Houses in Vevčani
Cultural heritage of North Macedonia
Houses completed in 1904